Arthur McCormack may refer to:

 Arthur John McCormack (1866–1936), English businessman and patent holder.
 Arthur T. McCormack (1872–1943), American physician and public health officer

See also
Arthur MacCormick (1864–1948), New Zealand cricketer